Prince Rupert/Digby Island Water Aerodrome  is located  west of Prince Rupert, British Columbia, Canada. It is located on Digby Island.

Airlines and destinations

See also
 List of airports in the Prince Rupert area

References

Seaplane bases in British Columbia
Transport in Prince Rupert, British Columbia
Registered aerodromes in British Columbia